Vincent Deporter (13 February 1959 – 27 September 2022) was a Belgian comic and storyboard artist. Deporter got his start in comics working as an assistant to Jean Graton, before selling his own strips, as Mike Deporter, to Spirou magazine. From 1996, after relocating to New York, he worked on DC's line of comic books adapted from popular animated cartoons, like Scooby-Doo and Ed, Edd n Eddy, and also inked many of the Batman, and Superman style-guides. He continued to work for Nickelodeon, notably on SpongeBob SquarePants. When Nickelodeon Magazine ended its print run, he then started to write and draw for the SpongeBob Comics as a regular contributor. Deporter also wrote and illustrated on more philosophical issues. He illustrated the book Sacred Cows: a Lighthearted Look at Belief and Tradition around the World, by the host of The Thinking Atheist Seth Andrews. He lived in Arizona, painting and writing non-graphic novels.

Bibliography
Comic work includes:

Roméo (with Philippe Rive, Glénat, 1994) 
Mimi Siku (with Hervé Palud, Glénat, 1994) 
The Big Book of (Paradox Press):
 Weird Wild West: How the West Was Really Won! (1998, ISBN W1563893614)
 Grimm: Truly Scary Fairy Tales to Frighten the Whole Family  (2000)
 Bad: The Best of the Worst of Everything (2001)
 Vice (2001)
 Les Fourmidables (Bamboo)
Des fourmis dans les jambes (2003)
Cirques divers (2004)
Cartoon Cartoons:
 Name That Toon! (tpb collecting Dexter's Laboratory #1 & 4, Cartoon Cartoons #1-4 and Cartoon Network Starring #2, 2004)
 The Gangs All Here  (tpb collecting Dexter's Laboratory #5-6, Cartoon Cartoons #5 & 7 and Cartoon Network Starring #7)
Scooby-Doo:
 Vol. 5. Surf's Up (written by Chris Duffy, Joe Edkin and Terrance Griep, DC Comics, 2006)
 Vol. 6. Space Fright (written by Chris Duffy, Joe Edkin and Terrance Griep, DC Comics, 2006)
SpongeBob SquarePants:
"Best in Show (Nick Zone) " (written by Tracey West)
"Beyond Bikini Bottom! " (written by Sonali Fry)
"Special Delivery!" (written by Steven Banks)
"Stop the Presses!" (written by Steven Banks)
"The Song That Never Ends" (written by Steven Banks)
"The Three Little Neighbors" (written by David Lewman, Gene Vosough)
"SpongeBob SquarePants Phonics Box" (written by Sonia Sander)
"Hoedown Showdown" (written by Kelli Chipponeri, also illustrated by Barry Goldberg)

References

External links
Vince Deporter official site
Vincent Deporter biography on Lambiek Comiclopedia
 Mike Deporter publications dans Le journal de Spirou BDoubliées

1959 births
2022 deaths
Belgian comics artists
Belgian storyboard artists
People from Nivelles